Vladimir Vitalyevich Boykov (born 3 June 1976) is a former Russian professional football player.

Club career
He played 4 seasons in the Russian Football National League for FC Dynamo Saint Petersburg and FC Oryol.

References

1976 births
People from Kostroma
Sportspeople from Kostroma Oblast
Living people
Russian footballers
Association football midfielders
FC Oryol players
FC Dynamo Saint Petersburg players
FC Dynamo Vologda players
FC Lukhovitsy players
FC Spartak Kostroma players